Colin Farrell Camerer (born December 4, 1959) is an American behavioral economist, and Robert Kirby Professor of Behavioral Finance and Economics at the California Institute of Technology (Caltech).

Background
A former child prodigy, Camerer received a B.A. in quantitative studies from Johns Hopkins University in 1977 (at age 17), followed by an M.B.A. in finance from the University of Chicago in 1979 and a Ph.D. in behavioral decision theory from that same institution in 1981 (at age 21) for thesis titled The Validity and Utility of Expert Judgment under the supervision of Hillel Einhorn and Robin Hogarth.  Camerer worked at Kellogg, Wharton, and the University of Chicago Booth School of Business before moving to Caltech in 1994.

Camerer's research is on the interface between cognitive psychology and economics.  This work seeks a better understanding of the psychological and neurobiological basis of decision-making in order to determine the validity of models of human economic behavior. His research uses mostly economics experiments—and occasionally field studies—to understand how people behave when making decisions (e.g., risky gambles for money), in games, and in markets (e.g., speculative price bubbles).

He spoke at the Econometric Society World Congress in London on August 20, 2005 and at the Nobel Centennial Symposium in 2001 on Behavioral and Experimental Economics.

He is the author of "Behavioral Game Theory" published by Princeton University Press in 2003.

During the late 1990s and until mid-2008, Camerer began instructing college courses in fields such as Cognitive Psychology, Microeconomic Theory, Behavioral Economics, and Organizational Design. These courses were held at a variety of different universities, including the aforementioned California Institute of Technology and additionally New York University.

In September 2013, Camerer was named a MacArthur fellow.

Fever Records
In 1983, Camerer started a record label called "Fever Records" as "an economics experiment". Bands that he signed to the label include the Dead Milkmen, Big Black and Get Smart!. The label was part of the Enigma Records group of labels.

Another Fever Records was founded in the 1980s in New York City to distribute rap records, and has no connection.

Selected bibliography

References

External links
 Personal webpage at Caltech
  "Mind Reading: The New Science of Decision Making", from Newsweek
 Colin Camerer's CV

1959 births
Living people
21st-century American economists
Behavioral economists
Game theorists
Johns Hopkins University alumni
University of Chicago Booth School of Business alumni
California Institute of Technology faculty
MacArthur Fellows
Fellows of the Econometric Society
Fellows of the American Academy of Arts and Sciences
Nancy L. Schwartz Memorial Lecture speakers